The 2021 American Athletic Conference women's soccer tournament was the postseason women's soccer tournament for the American Athletic Conference held from October 31 to November 7, 2021. The first round was hosted by the higher seed, and the Semifinals and Final took place at the home field of the regular season champion. South Florida. The six-team single-elimination tournament consisted of three rounds based on seeding from regular season conference play. The South Florida Bulls are the defending tournament champions. South Florida was unable to defend its title, losing on penalties to Memphis in the final.  Memphis' win was the program's second and also the second for coach Brooks Monaghan. As tournament champions, Memphis earned the American's automatic berth into the 2021 NCAA Division I Women's Soccer Tournament.

Seeding 
The top six teams in the regular season earned a spot in the tournament.

Bracket

Source:

Schedule

Quarterfinals

Semifinals

Final

Statistics

Goalscorers

All-Tournament team

Source:

 * Offensive MVP
 ^ Defensive MVP

References 

 
American Athletic Conference Women's Soccer Tournament